Bastilla duplicata is a moth of the family Noctuidae first described by Robinson in 1975. It is endemic to Fiji.

References

External links
"Dysgonia duplicata". Moths in Fiji. Archived July 26, 2011.

Bastilla (moth)
Moths described in 1975